Mount Royal Chalet is a building located near the summit of Mount Royal in Montreal, Quebec, Canada. The chalet was constructed in 1932 under the mayoralty of Camillien Houde as a make-work project during the Great Depression.  The French Beaux Arts structure was designed by Montreal architect Aristide Beaugrand-Champagne (1876-1950).

The building can host various events with room for 300 to 700 patrons. The southside of the building is a bricked courtyard and lookout with a view of Montreal's skyline from Mont-Royal.

References

External links
 

Beaux-Arts architecture in Canada
Buildings and structures completed in 1932
Buildings and structures in Montreal
History of Montreal
Landmarks in Montreal
Mount Royal